The North Sydney Leagues Club (rebranded as Norths) is a licensed club located in Abbott Street, Cammeray. The club was established in 1955 by the district's football club, the North Sydney Bears, in a house in the Sydney suburb of Neutral Bay. The club has occupied its current premises since 1964.

In the fifty years the new building has stood, a number of redesigns and refurbishments have taken place. In 2014, facilities comprised two dining areas, function rooms, a 530-seat auditorium, a fitness and wellness centre, indoor and outdoor lounge areas, a bottle shop, a TAB, two squash courts, a courtesy bus service, a members rewards program and a multi-level car park for 320 vehicles. In 2014 club membership was 2,500.

In 1996, Norths merged with the North Sydney Bowling Club, which was established in 1888 and is the second oldest club (by one day) in Australia. Norths also amalgamated with Seagulls Club, a border club at Tweed Heads on the far north coast of New South Wales, the oldest provincial rugby league club in Australia.

See also

List of restaurants in Australia

References

External links

North Sydney Bears
Drinking establishments in Australia
Restaurants in New South Wales
1955 establishments in Australia
Licensed clubs in New South Wales